The 1935 Ice Hockey World Championships were held from January 19 to January 27, 1935, at the Eisstadion Davos in Davos, Switzerland, in which a record 15 countries took part. The teams first played in four preliminary round groups (three groups of four and a group of three). Unlike in the previous year, Canada participated in the preliminary round. The first two teams in each group advanced to the semifinal round, while the remaining seven played in a consolation round to determine positions 9 through 15. In the semifinal round there were two groups of four teams. The first two teams in each group advanced to a final round while the remaining teams played for positions 5 though 8. Canada won its eighth world championship title while the host, Switzerland, won its second European championship.

First round

Group A

Group B

Group C

Group D

Semifinal round

Group  A 

* Teams jointly decided not to play extra time.

Group B

Consolation round – 9th to 15th places

Group  A

Group B 

9th-place match

Consolation round – 5th to 8th places 

Classification Matches

5th-place match

France and Italy decide by common agreement not to play the classification match for seventh place because of too many injured players on both teams.

Final round – 1st to 4th places

Final rankings – World Championship

Final rankings – European Championship

References
Complete results

IIHF Men's World Ice Hockey Championships
Ice Hockey World Championships
Sport in Davos
International ice hockey competitions hosted by Switzerland
Ice Hockey World Championships